The Chimera of Arezzo is regarded as the best example of ancient Etruscan art. The British art historian David Ekserdjian described the sculpture as "one of the most arresting of all animal sculptures and the supreme masterpiece of Etruscan bronze-casting".  Made entirely of bronze and measuring 78.5 cm high with a length of 129 cm, it was found alongside a small collection of other bronze statues in Arezzo, an ancient Etruscan and Roman city in Tuscany. The statue was originally part of a larger sculptural group representing a fight between a Chimera and the Greek hero Bellerophon. This sculpture is likely to have been created as a votive offering to the Etruscan god Tinia.

History 
According to Greek mythology the Chimera or "she-goat" was a monstrous, fire-breathing hybrid creature of Lycia in Asia Minor, created by the binding of multiple animal parts to create a singular unnatural creature. As the offspring of Typhon and Echidna, the Chimera ravaged the lands of Lycia at a disastrous pace. Distressed by the destruction of his lands, the king of Lycia, Iobates, ordered a young warrior named Bellerophon to slay the dreaded Chimera, also as a favor to a neighboring king, Proetus. Proetus wanted Bellerophon dead because his wife accused him of ravishing her, and he assumed that the warrior would perish in the attempt to kill the beast. Bellerophon set out on his winged horse, Pegasus, and emerged victorious from his battle, eventually winning not only the hand of Iobates' daughter but also his kingdom. It is this story that led art historians to believe that the Chimera of Arezzo was originally part of a group sculpture that included Bellerophon and Pegasus. Votive offerings for the gods often depicted mythological stories. A round hole on the left rump of the Chimera might suggest a spot where Bellerophon may have struck the beast with a now-missing spear. The first known literary reference was in Homer's Iliad, and the epic poetry of Hesiod in the 8th century BCE also mentions the Chimera.

In response to questions of the statue's true meaning, Vasari wrote in his Reasonings Over the Inventions He Painted in Florence in the Palace of Their Serene Highnesses:"Yes, sir, because there are the medals of the Duke my lord who came from Rome with a goat's head stuck in the neck of this lion, who as he sees VE, also has the serpent's belly, and we found the queue that was broken between those bronze fragments with many metal figurines that you've seen all, and the wounds that she has touched on show it, and yet the pain that is known in the readiness of the head of this animal ..."The tail was not restored until 1785 when the Pistoiese sculptor Francesco Carradori (or his teacher, Innocenzo Spinazzi) fashioned a replacement, incorrectly positioning the serpent to bite the goat's horn. It is much more likely that the snake had to strike out against Bellerophon instead, since biting the head of the goat meant it was biting itself. Inscribed on its right foreleg is an inscription in the ancient Etruscan language. It has been variously deciphered, but most recently it is thought to read TINSCVIL, meaning: "Offering belonging to Tinia", indicating that the bronze was a votive object dedicated to the supreme Etruscan god of day, Tin or Tinia. The original statue is estimated to have been created around 400 BCE. In 1718, the sculpture was transported to the Uffizi Gallery and later, along with the remaining collection Cosimo I had originally seized, taken to the Palazzo della Crocetta. Court intellectuals of the time considered the Chimera of Arezzo to be a symbol of the Medici domination of the Grand Duchy of Tuscany. Its permanent residence is in the National Archaeological Museum in Florence, from which it was placed on brief loan to the Getty Villa for an exhibition in 2010.

The sculpture was probably commissioned by an aristocratic clan or a prosperous community and erected in a religious sanctuary near the ancient Etruscan town of Arezzo, about 50 miles southeast of Florence. The Chimera was one of a hoard of bronzes that had been carefully buried for safety sometime in classical antiquity. A bronze replica now stands near the spot of its original discovery.

The Etruscans 
The  Etruscan civilization was a wealthy civilization in ancient Italy with roots in the ancient region of Etruria, which existed during the early 8th–6th century BCE and extended over what is now a part of modern Tuscany, western Umbria, and northern Lazio. The region became a part of the Roman Republic after the Roman–Etruscan Wars.

Heavily influenced by Ancient Greek culture, Etruscan art is characterized by the use of terracotta, metalworking—especially in bronze—as well as jewelry and engraved gems. Metal and bronze trinkets from the Mediterranean rapidly began to appear around Etruria. It is not clear to historians exactly when trading with the Eastern Mediterranean began; however, it is clear that both Phoenicians and Greeks must have been interested in the metal ores of Etruria, causing a rise in popularity of the art trade in these regions. The Etruscans were well known for their art throughout the Orientalizing Period (700–600 BCE), the Archaic Period (600–480 BCE), and the Hellenistic Period (2nd to 1st century BCE).

The discovery 
Discovered on November 15, 1553, by construction workers near the San Lorentino gate in Arezzo (ancient Arretium), the sculpture was quickly claimed for the collection of the Medici Grand Duke of Tuscany, Cosimo I, who placed it publicly in the Palazzo Vecchio in the hall of Leo X. Cosimo also placed the smaller bronzes from the trove in his own studiolo at Palazzo Pitti, where "the Duke took great pleasure in cleaning them by himself, with some goldsmith's tools", as Benvenuto Cellini reported in his autobiography. On discovery, the statue was missing the snake and its left front and rear paws. Due to its fragmented state upon discovery, the statue was originally regarded as a lion. The Italian painter Giorgio Vasari tracked down the statue motif by studying Ancient Greek and Roman coins, such as a silver stater featuring an image of the Chimera, thus accurately identifying it. Eventually, it was officially identified as being a part of a larger piece illustrating a fight between the Chimera and the Greek hero Bellerophon. The sculpture was found among other small pieces that served as votive offerings to the God Tinia. This sculpture may also have served as an Etruscan religious dedication. After discovery, it began its residence in Florence, where it was moved to the Uffizi Palace in 1718. Since 1870, the Chimera of Arezzo has made its home at the National Archaeological Museum in Florence. As the sculpture made its way through the Florence museums, it increasingly attracted the attention of both artists and historians.

Iconography 
Typical iconography of the Chimera myth depicts the warrior Bellerophon as he confronts the Chimera, or rides atop or alongside it. This iconography began to appear upon Greek vessels in 600 BCE. The Chimera of Arezzo presents a very detailed and complex composition that most likely was meant for display and viewing in the round. The Chimera is clearly expressing pain throughout its body. Its form is contorted, its face and mouth open in outrage as it is struck by Bellerophon. Similar to Hellenistic sculpture, the Chimera's form and body language express movement as well as the clear tension and power of the beast's musculature and evoke in the viewer a feeling of deep emotional pain and interest in the contemplation of that movement. 
Clearly influenced by Mediterranean myth culture, this bronze work is evidence of the mastery that Etruscan sculptors had not only over the medium but of mythological lore. The art historian A. Maggiani gives details of a clear Italiote context by pointing out iconographic comparisons from sites in Magna Graecia such as Metaponto and Kaulonia. (Italiote refers to a pre–Roman Empire Greek-speaking population in southern Italy; Magna Graecia refers to the Greek colonies which were established in southern Italy from the 8th century BCE onwards.) With the Italiote context in mind, these trends are a clear indication of the increasing popularity of Attic (from Attica) or Athens-inspired architecture and sculpture. Ancient Athenians regarded themselves among the highest of society. Their art, religion, and culture was seen as the epitome of Greek achievement. While the ancient Athenians had long since perished by this time, their work and way of life were still regarded with great fascination and there was a desire to emulate it. Historians have generally come to a consensus that the Chimera of Arezzo was produced by Italiote craftsmen in the last decades of the fifth century BCE or in the beginning of the fourth century BCE. The fact that this sculpture was a votive offering to Tinia is a reminder of the wealth and sophistication of Etruscan elites.

Methods and materials 
In the 3rd millennium BCE ancient foundry workers discovered by trial and error that bronze had distinct advantages over pure copper for making artistic statuary. Bronze stays liquid longer when filling a mold due to its lower melting point. Bronze is a superior metal to copper for sculpture casting because of its higher tensile strength. The island of Cyprus supplied most of the bronze used for artistic purposes throughout the ancient Mediterranean region.

The earliest forms of Greek bronze sculptures were simple, hand-worked sheets of bronze known as sphyrelaton (literally, "hammer-driven"). Like modern clay sculpture, these metal sheets could be embellished by hammering the metal over various wooden shapes made with textures that created a desired look or depth. This was later adapted to become the technique known today as tracing. By the late Archaic period (c. 500–480 BCE) sphyrelaton lost popularity as lost-wax casting became the primary means of producing bronze sculpture. Lost-wax casting of bronze was achieved in three different ways, each with its own desired effects. The first and earliest method was solid casting, which required a model of the sculpture to be fashioned in solid wax and then carved. The second method was hollow lost-wax casting, which was created by a direct process. Finally, the third was hollow lost-wax casting by an indirect process. The model is packed in clay, and then heated in what today would be similar to a kiln to remove the wax and harden the clay. Then, the mold is inverted and metal poured inside it to create a cast. When cooled, the bronze-smith cracks open the clay model to reveal a solid bronze replica.

For smaller details, sculptors often made eyes out of glass and painted on body hair, clothing details, and skin color. Lost in antiquity, most historical knowledge of how certain bronze statues would have looked comes from studying surviving Roman marble copies.

Gallery

Exhibitions 
 September 15, 2012 – December 9, 2012 at the Royal Academy of Arts "Bronze"   July 16, 2009 – February 8, 2010 at the Getty Villa

See also
Capitoline Wolf, a bronze long thought to be of 4th-century BCE Etruscan origin, but possibly medieval.

References

Ugo Bardi, 1997. "The Chimaera of Arezzo"

Animals in art
Etruscan sculptures
Etruscan mythology
Treasure troves of Italy
National Archaeological Museum, Florence
Archaeological discoveries in Italy
5th-century BC sculptures